Major Edward Croft-Murray (1 September 1907 – 18 September 1980) was a British antiquarian, an expert on British art, and Keeper of the Department of Prints and Drawings at the British Museum from 1954 to 1973.

He was educated at Lancing College and Magdalen College, Oxford, and rose to the rank of Major in World War II.

He is buried at St Peter's Church, Petersham.

References

1907 births
1980 deaths
Burials at St Peter's, Petersham
Monuments men
People educated at Lancing College
Alumni of Magdalen College, Oxford